Jack Ryan (born 1928) is an Irish retired hurler who played as a right corner-forward for the Tipperary senior team.

Ryan joined the team during the 1947 championship and was a regular member of the extended panel until his retirement after the 1953 championship. During that time he won one All-Ireland medal and two National Hurling League medals.

At club level Ryan was a multiple North Tipperary divisional medalist with Roscrea.

His brothers, Mick and Dinny Ryan, also played with Tipperary.

References

1928 births
Living people
Roscrea hurlers
Tipperary inter-county hurlers
All-Ireland Senior Hurling Championship winners